The Mayor of Grey, often referred to as the Mayor of Greymouth, officiates over the Grey District of New Zealand which is administered by the Grey District Council with its seat in Greymouth. The current Mayor is Tania Gibson. Two predecessors to this office were the Mayor of Greymouth, officiating over the Greymouth Borough Council from 1868, and from 1877 the chairman of the Grey County Council.

History
The Greymouth Borough was constituted in 1868 under the Municipal Corporations Act, 1867. This covered the urban area of Greymouth.

After provincial government had been abolished in 1876, counties were formed in the following year. One of those was Grey County that covered an area around Greymouth. The first chairman of Grey County was Arthur Guinness.

Greymouth Borough and Grey County were abolished in the 1989 local government reforms, when the areas became part of Grey District. Since then, the head of the administration has been the mayor of Grey.

List of mayors and chairmen

Mayors of Greymouth Borough
The first elections were held in Greymouth Borough on 26 August 1868, when nine councillors were elected. Even before the councillors met for the first time, it was discovered that the legislation required for three of them to retire by rotation on 10 September. All three councillors stood for re-election, but one of them was replaced by Edward Masters. At the first meeting of the council in the following week, Masters was elected the first Mayor of Greymouth by his fellow councillors.

Barry Dallas was mayor of Greymouth from 1966 to 1968, and from 1980 until the borough's abolition in 1989. He then became the inaugural mayor of the new Grey District.

Chairmen of the Grey County

Mayors of Grey District

References

Grey
Grey District
Grey
Grey